Chesebro is a surname. Notable people with the surname include:

Caroline Chesebro' (1825–1873), American writer
George Chesebro (1888–1959), American actor
James Chesebro (1944–2020), American academic
Ray L. Chesebro (1880–1954), American judge and attorney